Maurice Long may refer to:

People
Maurice Long (politician) (1866-1923), French politician
Maurice W. Long (born 1925), American engineer

Fictional characters
 Maurice Long, a character from the TV soap opera Riverdale (1997 TV series)

Other uses
 Maurice Long Museum (Musée Mauice Long), Grand Palais (Hanoi), Hanoi, French Indochina; a former economics museum in what is now Vietnam
 Maurice Long, a WWII French patrol ship; see List of shipwrecks in March 1945

See also

 Maurice Longbottom
 Staats Long Morris (1728–1800), British army general
 .297/230 Morris Long, variant of the .297/230 Morris
 Maurice (disambiguation)
 Long (disambiguation)